The Koivuhovi railway station is a station on the Helsinki commuter rail network, located between the stations of Kauniainen and Tuomarila. 

The station serves the E commuter line from Helsinki to Kaukalahti; and the U and night train L lines between Helsinki and Kirkkonummi.

The station has two platforms, and was opened in its current form in 1997.

References 

Railway stations in Uusimaa
Railway stations opened in 1997
Kauniainen